Qesh Robat (also Romanized as Qesh Robāţ and Qosh Robāţ; also known as Qashrābād) is a village in Pain Rokh Rural District, Jolgeh Rokh District, Torbat-e Heydarieh County, Razavi Khorasan Province, Iran. At the 2006 census, its population was 470, in 102 families.

References 

Populated places in Torbat-e Heydarieh County